Nevertire is a rural village in New South Wales, Australia.  It is located at the junction of the Mitchell Highway and the Oxley Highway, in Warren Shire. Nevertire is about 496 kilometres northwest of Sydney, 78 km north-west of Narromine and about 107 km from Dubbo. It is about 20 km south-west of Warren on the western end of the Oxley Highway.  At the 2011 census, Nevertire had a population of 225 people.

History
Originally the village was known as Warren Pond. The Main West railway line reached Nevertire in 1882 and the local pub was already trading before the town was surveyed in 1883.  The town was devastated by a tornado on 28 December 1896. The town once had a railway station, operated by the State Rail Authority, but with the demise of country rail travel in the 1980s, the passenger services were replaced by a coach service run by CountryLink.

Services 
Nevertire is at the junction of the Main Western railway line to Nyngan and the branch line to Warren. The village is now served by three CountryLink Coach services: one to Bourke, one to Nyngan and one to Cobar/Broken Hill. Bourke Coach operates four times per week, the Broken Hill coach operates daily, and the Nyngan coach, which also serves Warren, operates four times per week.

There is a large grain handling facility on the railway line, operated by GrainCorp, and served by Pacific National trains.  
Local businesses also include a local pub (which is also the local post office), a cafe, mechanic and a rural supplies outlet.

Education 
Nevertire Public school closed at the conclusion of the 2002 academic year, due to a lack of enrolments. Children in Nevertire now go to Warren Central School or St Mary's in Warren.

The village is the subject of Betty Casey's poem Nevertire and Henry Lawson once described it as the edge of the Great Grey Plain.

References

External links

Towns in New South Wales
Warren Shire